Nicholas Stephen Manton  (born 2 October 1952 in the City of Westminster) is a British mathematical physicist. He is a Professor of Mathematical Physics at the Department of Applied Mathematics and Theoretical Physics of the University of Cambridge and a fellow of St John's College.

Education
Manton earned his PhD from the University of Cambridge in 1978, under the supervision of Peter  Goddard. His thesis was entitled Magnetic Monopoles and Other Extended Objects in Field Theory.

Research 
Manton has made contributions to the theory of soliton-like particles in two and three dimensions. He calculated the forces between static and moving monopoles and vortices in gauge theories, leading to the geometrical idea of moduli space dynamics. This has been applied to the classical, quantum and statistical mechanics of solitons. He has also developed the theory of skyrmions as a soliton model of atomic nuclei.

He discovered the unstable sphaleron solution in the electroweak sector of the Standard Model of particle physics. The Higgs field is topologically twisted within a sphaleron. The sphaleron defines an energy scale for baryon and lepton number violation in the early universe — an energy scale within the range of the Large Hadron Collider. His other work includes the construction of a 10-dimensional theory containing supergravity and Yang–Mills theory, which is a low-energy limit of superstring theory.

Awards and honours 
Manton was elected a Fellow of the Royal Society (FRS) in 1996.

Publications 

Topological Solitons (Cambridge Monographs on Mathematical Physics), by N. Manton and P. Sutcliffe (Cambridge University Press, 2004) .
The Physical World: An Inspirational Tour of Fundamental Physics, by M. Manton and N. Mee (Oxford University Press, 2017) .
Skyrmions - A Theory Of Nuclei, by N. Manton (World Scientific, 2022) .

References 

1952 births
Living people
20th-century British mathematicians
21st-century British mathematicians
Fellows of the Royal Society
Fellows of St John's College, Cambridge